"We are marching in wide fields" was the march of the Russian Liberation Army, which fought in World War II on the side of Nazi Germany. The song was recorded in Berlin in the propaganda department of the "Vineta" of the Reich Ministry of Public Enlightenment and Propaganda.

History  
Flaume, whose family emigrated from Russia to Latvia after the Russian Civil War, studied at the Faculty of Philology of the University of Latvia, was a member of the student society "Ruthenia". He based the march of the ROA on his poem "The One who is faithful to our motto", published in Riga in 1939 in the poetry collection "The Songbook of Ruthenia". According to historian Boris Ravdin, the song is poetically and meaningfully superior to the earlier marches of collaborators. The Germans distributed the text of the march on leaflets and posters. In the collection "Songbook of a Volunteer", published in 1943 in Narva, sheet music was published. The song was first performed on June 22, 1943, on Pskov radio during a parade in which the first  took part. The leader of the People's Labor Union , who visited occupied Pskov in 1943, recalled that after the arrival of General Andrey Vlasov in the city, the local radio station played the march of the ROA daily.

References

1943 songs
Russian military marches
Songs of World War II
Russian-language songs
Russian Liberation Army